Gilles Rousset (born 22 August 1963) is a French former professional footballer, who played as a goalkeeper.
Rousset started his career with Sochaux in 1982, where he spent eight seasons, playing more than 100 times for the Montbéliard side before he was transferred to Olympique Lyonnais in 1990. He quickly established himself as the first choice goalkeeper at the Stade de Gerland, playing 98 matches over the next 3 seasons.

During this period, Rousset was capped twice by France. He was selected in the squad for the 1992 Euro Championships although, as second choice goalkeeper, he did not play in Sweden.

In 1993, Rousset was surprisingly transferred to Olympique de Marseille, who were the reigning European Champions but embroiled in a corruption scandal. The presence of rising star Fabien Barthez ensured Rousset did not start a competitive match for the club and when Marseille were forcibly relegated in the summer of 1994, as punishment for their match fixing crimes, Rousset (and many other established players) were sold.

Rousset spent the next season with Stade Rennais before moving to Scotland to join Heart of Midlothian in 1995. He spent six seasons in Edinburgh, helping transform a Hearts side that had flirted with relegation into a dominant domestic competitor that came very close to splitting the Old Firm. He also won his only major honour there, the Scottish Cup in 1998, having been a losing finalist on 3 previous occasions earlier in his career (1988 with Sochaux and twice in 1996 with Hearts). The Scottish Cup was the first major trophy for Hearts in 36 years and Rousset went on to become a Hearts legend.

Honours
Hearts
 Scottish Cup (1): 1997–98

External links
London Hearts player profile
 
 
Profile at French federation official site 

1963 births
Living people
Sportspeople from Hyères
French footballers
Expatriate footballers in Scotland
French expatriate footballers
France international footballers
FC Sochaux-Montbéliard players
Olympique Lyonnais players
Olympique de Marseille players
Stade Rennais F.C. players
Heart of Midlothian F.C. players
UEFA Euro 1992 players
Ligue 1 players
Scottish Premier League players
Scottish Football League players
French expatriate sportspeople in Scotland
Association football goalkeepers
Beijing Guoan F.C. non-playing staff
Association football goalkeeping coaches
Footballers from Provence-Alpes-Côte d'Azur